Shmuel Rechtman (born 1924, died 23 July 1988) was an Israeli politician who served as mayor of Rehovot from 1970 until 1979, and as a member of the Knesset for Likud between 1977 and 1979.

Biography
Born in Rehovot during the Mandate era, Rechtman worked as the administrative director of the Kfar Silver agricultural high school.

He joined the General Zionists in 1949, and was one of the heads of the Liberal Workers Union. After the General Zionists merged into the Liberal Party in 1961, Rechtman became chairman of the party's national council. He was elected onto Rehovot city council in 1965, and in 1970 he became mayor.

In 1976 he became a member of the Likud directorate (the party was then an alliance of the Liberal Party, Herut and other right-wing parties), and was also chairman of the Likud bloc in the Histadrut trade union. He was elected to the Knesset on the Likud list in 1977. However, early in the Knesset session he was charged with taking bribes from a building contractor. Following a vote held by Rechtman's consent, his parliamentary immunity was withdrawn. In January 1978 he was found guilty and sentenced to three and a half years in prison. He appealed to the Supreme Court, and continued in the Knesset until his appeal was dismissed. He resigned his seat on 18 June 1979, and was replaced by David Stern. He also stepped down as mayor of Rehovot and left the Likud directorate. He was later imprisoned, becoming the first member of the Knesset to be jailed.

Rechtman died on 23 July 1988.

See also
 List of Israeli public officials convicted of crimes or misdemeanors

References

External links

1924 births
1988 deaths
General Zionists politicians
Israeli government officials convicted of crimes
Israeli people convicted of bribery
Israeli politicians convicted of corruption
Israeli prisoners and detainees
Israeli trade unionists
Jews in Mandatory Palestine
Jewish Israeli politicians
Liberal Party (Israel) politicians
Likud politicians
Mayors of places in Israel
Members of the 9th Knesset (1977–1981)
People from Rehovot
Prisoners and detainees of Israel
Israeli politicians convicted of crimes